Dr. John W. Kebabian was a neuropharmacologist and neuroscientist who was the first to discover that there were multiple subtypes of dopamine receptors. His pioneering work which was published in 1979 revolutionized the understanding of the role of dopamine receptors in cognition, movement and mental disorders. He died on May 1, 2012.

References

External links
 ResearchGate.net: John W. Kebabian

American pharmacologists
American neuroscientists
Armenian_scientists
Ethnic Armenian scientists
1946 births
2012 deaths